Willoughby with Sloothby is a civil parish in the East Lindsey district of Lincolnshire in the East Midlands of England. The parish includes the settlements of Willoughby and Sloothby as well as the hamlets and villages of Bonthorpe, Mawthorpe, Hasthorpe and Habertoft. The parish covers quite a large area of East Lindsey with the towns of Alford, Mablethorpe, Spilsby, Skegness and Burgh le Marsh situated near the parish. The parish's nearest railway station is Skegness. The village of Willoughby was served by a station on the former East Lincolnshire Railway and Mablethorpe Loop Line. However, it closed in 1970 and so did the lines. The station master's house and a section of platform and goods shed survive near the site.

References 

Civil parishes in Lincolnshire
East Lindsey District